The men's heptathlon event  at the 1995 IAAF World Indoor Championships was held on 11–12 March.

Medalists

Results

60 metres

Long jump

Shot put

High jump

60 metres hurdles

Pole vault

1000 metres

Final standings

References

Heptathlon
Combined events at the World Athletics Indoor Championships